"See Ya" is a song by British girl group Atomic Kitten, released as the second single from their debut album, Right Now (2000). The song was written by Stuart Kershaw, Andy McCluskey, and Atomic Kitten-member Liz McClarnon. It was produced by Engine and Pete Craigie, with the radio mix receiving production from Cutfather & Joe. The single peaked at number six on the UK Singles Chart, reached number 50 in Ireland, and was a minor hit in the Flanders region of Belgium.

Track listings

UK CD1
 "See Ya" (radio mix) – 2:52
 "See Ya" (The Progress Boy Wunda edit) – 3:14
 "See Ya" (Sleaze Sisters Anthem mix) – 6:23
 "See Ya" (video) – 2:51

UK CD2
 "See Ya" – 2:52
 "See Ya" (Kitty Karaoke version) – 2:52
 Interview with Atomic Kitten – 6:46

UK cassette single
 "See Ya" – 2:52
 "See Ya" (Sizzling Danish mix) – 3:16
 "See Ya" (Solomon Paradise mix) – 5:38

European CD single
 "See Ya" (radio mix) – 2:52
 "See Ya" (Sleaze Sisters Anthem mix) – 6:23

Credits and personnel
Credits are lifted from the UK CD1 liner notes and the Right Now album booklet.

Studios
 Recorded at Motor Museum Studios (Liverpool, England)
 Radio mix recorded at C & J Studios (Copenhagen, Denmark)
 Mixed at Stanley House Studios (London, England)

Personnel

 Stuart Kershaw – writing, guitar, keys and programming
 Andy McCluskey – writing, keys and programming
 Liz McClarnon – writing
 Atomic Kitten – vocals
 Jonas Krag – guitar
 Isobel Griffiths – strings
 Mich Hedin Hansen – percussion

 Engine – original production, original engineering
 Pete Craigie – original production
 Pat O'Shaughnessy – original engineering
 Nick Ingman – string arrangement and conductor
 Cutfather & Joe – radio mix production
 Mads Nilsson – radio mix engineering
 Joe Belmaati – radio mix keys and programming

Charts

References

2000 singles
2000 songs
Atomic Kitten songs
Innocent Records singles
Song recordings produced by Cutfather & Joe
Songs written by Andy McCluskey
Songs written by Liz McClarnon
Songs written by Stuart Kershaw
Virgin Records singles